Walsham-le-Willows Football Club is a football club based in the village of Walsham le Willows in Suffolk, England. The club is affiliated to the Suffolk County FA.

History
Walsham-le-Willows F.C. was founded around 1890, and played at the Summer Road sports ground where there was a pavilion with a thatched roof. During World War II, the ground was ploughed up to grow food and was not returned to sports use until 1951.

The club was a founder member of the St. Edmundsbury Football League in 1907 and won the Suffolk Junior Cup in 1988, 1989 and 1990. After winning several league titles, the club switched to the Suffolk and Ipswich League in 1989. It won the Senior Division in 2001–02 and again in 2002–03. In the following season, the club finished second, but earned promotion to Division One of the Eastern Counties League.

The club finished fourth in their first season in the division, narrowly missing out on promotion. They also reached the final of the Suffolk Senior Cup, losing 2–1 to Needham Market. The following season, they reached the final again, this time beating Capel Plough 4–3 after extra time. In 2006–07 the club won Division One, and were promoted to the Premier Division.

Ground
The club play at Summer Road, a sports ground shared with Walsham-le-Willows Cricket Club and Walsham-le-Willows Bowls Club. The ground is managed by Walsham-le-Willows Sports Club.

Honours
Eastern Counties League
Division One Champions 2006–07
Suffolk & Ipswich League
Senior Division Champions 2001–02, 2002–03
League Cup Winners 1999, 2000, 2002
Suffolk Senior Cup
Winners 2006
Suffolk Junior Cup
Winners 1988, 1989, 1990

Records
Best FA Cup performance: Preliminary round, 2007–08, 2008–09, 2009–10, 2011–12
Best FA Vase performance: Second round, 2010–11, 2013–14

See also
Walsham-le-Willows F.C. players

References

External links
Club website

Football clubs in England
Football clubs in Suffolk
1890 establishments in England
Association football clubs established in 1890
St. Edmundsbury Football League
Suffolk and Ipswich Football League
Eastern Counties Football League
Walsham-le-Willows